Having Two Left Feet is an idiom for clumsiness, especially when dancing. It may also refer to:

 Two Left Feet (film), a 1963 British film
 "Two Left Feet" (song), a single by The Holloways